The 2012 Japan Sevens was the first edition of the tournament since 2001 and the seventh tournament of the 2011–12 IRB Sevens World Series. The host stadium was the Chichibunomiya Rugby Stadium.

Australia won the title by defeating Samoa 28–26 in the final.

Format
The teams were divided into pools of four teams, who played a round-robin within the pool. Points were awarded in each pool on a different schedule from most rugby tournaments—3 for a win, 2 for a draw, 1 for a loss.
The six pool winners and the two top second-place finishers advanced to the Cup competition, the Plate competition was contested by the losing quarterfinalists from the Cup.
The Bowl was contested by the four remaining second-place finishers and the top four third-place finishers while the Shield was contested by the remaining eight entrants.

Teams 
The following teams participated:

Pool stage
The draw was made on March 25.

Pool A

Pool B

Pool C

Pool D

Knockout stage

Shield

Bowl

Plate

Cup

References

External links

Japan Sevens
Seven
Japan Sevens